Mick Butler (born 1950 in Boolavogue, County Wexford) is an Irish former hurler. He played for his local club Buffer's Alley and was a member of the Wexford senior inter-county team from 1969 until 1981.

References

1950 births
Living people
Buffer's Alley hurlers
Wexford inter-county hurlers
Leinster inter-provincial hurlers